Translucence is a 1981 post-punk album by Poly Styrene.

Track listing
All tracks composed by Poly Styrene
"Dreaming" (3:48)
"Talk In Toytown" (3:21)
"Skydive" (4:10)
"Day That Time Forgot" (3:30)
"Shades" (3:20)
"Essence" (3:32)
"Hip City Hip" (3:02)
"Bicycle Song" (2:32)
"Sub Tropical" (3:04)
"Translucence" (3:12)
"Age" (3:09)
"Goodbye" (3:47)

Personnel
Poly Styrene - vocals
G.T. Moore - guitar
Richard Moore - guitar
Kuma Harada - bass
Richard Bailey - drums
Darryl Lee Que - percussion
Kevin McAlea - keyboards
Ted Bunting - saxophone, flute
Technical
Falcon Stuart - cover photography

References

1981 debut albums
United Artists Records albums
Poly Styrene albums
Post-punk albums
1981 albums
Post-punk albums by English artists